Santo Domingo del Estado is a town and municipal agency inhabited by trique Indians in the municipality of Putla Villa de Guerrero, Oaxaca, Mexico. In this town speak the trique language. Trique language name is Xuman' Lii which means "small town".

Education 
Santo Domingo del Estado has basic level school, e.g.:
 Indigenous early childhood education (Educación inicial indígena)
 Bilingual preschool "Benito Juarez"
 Bilingual elementary school "Benito Juarez"
Children go to secondary school and high school in Chicahuaxtla.

Health 
In this town there is a clinic provided by the Secretariat of Health (SSA) of the Mexican government, this clinic is run by a doctor and a person elected by the people. These people have the "Popular Insurance" provided by the Mexican government too.

Sports 
These natives like to play basketball and football. The festivities are held tournaments.

See also 
 Trique people
 Trique language

Bibliography

External links 
 Pueblos América: Santo Domingo del Estado. 

Populated places in Oaxaca